Kylian Ramé (born 26 July 1997) is a French professional footballer who plays for Engordany as a midfielder.

Career
Born in Bordeaux, Ramé began his career with the youth team of Bordeaux. He then played for Stade Bordelais and Italian club Foggia. On 31 January 2019, he was released from his contract by Foggia by mutual consent. He returned to France, signing for Mérignac-Arlac in June 2019, before signing with Andorran club Engordany.

References

1997 births
Living people
French footballers
Stade Bordelais (football) players
Calcio Foggia 1920 players
UE Engordany players
Championnat National 2 players
Championnat National 3 players
Serie B players
Primera Divisió players
Association football midfielders
French expatriate footballers
French expatriate sportspeople in Italy
Expatriate footballers in Italy
French expatriate sportspeople in Andorra
Expatriate footballers in Andorra